Sumio Kobayashi (小林純生 Kobayashi Sumio, born 29 December 1982 in Mie, Japan) is a Japanese poet and composer of contemporary classical music.

Biography 
He has received formal musical training, excelling with piano and solfège, since 1985. Having studied with Joji Yuasa and Hiroyuki Itoh, he won at the I.C.O.M.S. 29°Concorso Internazionale di Composizione, Gyeongsangnam-do Special Prize at Isang Yun Prize, was second place at the Toru Takemitsu Composition Award in 2013, was a finalist at Pablo Casals International Composition Competition in 2015 and won the International Composers' Competition of the European Capital of Culture Wrocław 2016. He has made appearances at festivals such as Takefu International Music Festival, Tongyeong International Music Festival, and Weimarer Frühjahrstage für zeitgenössische Musik.

Works 
 2013 A Silver Note of Perfumed Moon
 2014 Sounds from the Forests are
2014 Floraison d'eau
2015 Requiems
2016 Fugue - homage to Maurice Ravel
2016 Music by Krasnale
2018 Nostalghia
2020 Unreal Rain

External links 

Works by Japanese Composers
Sumio Kobayashi Official Website

References 

1982 births
21st-century classical composers
21st-century Japanese composers
21st-century Japanese male musicians
Composers for piano
Japanese classical composers
Japanese contemporary classical composers
Japanese film score composers
Japanese male classical composers
Japanese male film score composers
Living people
Music theorists
Musicians from Mie Prefecture